Nansemond River High School is a public secondary school in Suffolk, Virginia, United States.  It opened in September 1990 and originally consisted of students from three of the four former high schools of Suffolk, John F. Kennedy Middle School, Fred Cherry Middle School and John Yeates Middle School.  Nansemond River opened its doors to approximately 1700 students. The student population swelled to nearly 2000 students in 2003, and in 2004, a new high school, King's Fork, was formed.  As a result, Nansemond River's population dropped in the 2004-2005 school year to about 1100 students.  However, the following year, the school opened its doors to about 1200 students once again.

The current principal is Dr. Shawn Green, and the assistant principals, or administrators, are Janice Bibbo, Tara Firth, and Tina Paul. The dean of students is Denzel White.

Because of rezoning in 2004, the school district is composed of the rapidly suburbanizing Northeastern corner of the city, comprising the neighborhoods of Harbour View, Creekside, and the Yeates area, and other well-established communities such as Pughsville, Huntersville, and Bellville.

Administration

Administrative staff:
  Dr. Shawn Green, Ed.D, principal
  Tina Paul, assistant principal
  Tara Firth, assistant principal
  Denzel White, dean of students

General school information

  Grades 9-12
  Enrollment 2011-2012: 1446
  Senior class ('11): 321 (September, 2010)
  Approximate percentage of students continuing education in two or four year colleges or universities: 66% (Class of 2005)
  Odd/even scheduling
  Seniors complete senior portfolio in connection with English 12; AP students are exempt from this requirement
  85 teachers; 30% hold master's degrees; 4% hold doctorates; average years of experience: 20
  Student to teacher ratio: 17:1

Grading scale

2021:

A:   93-100 
A-:  90-92 
B+:  87-89 
B:   83-86 
B-:  80-82 
C+:  77-79 
C:   73-76 
C-:  70-72 
D+:  67-69 
D:   63-66 
F:   Below 63

Athletics and extracurricular activities

Athletics
The Warriors compete within the 5A Southeastern District along with Deep Creek, Great Bridge High School, Hickory High School, Indian River High School, Oscar Smith High School, Western Branch High School, and crosstown rivals King's Fork High School and Lakeland High School.
The Nansemond River "Warriors" compete in cheerleading, soccer, softball, swimming, football, track & field, cross country, theatre, field hockey, volleyball, baseball, basketball, and wrestling.
 In 2016, the women's track and field program was #1 in Virginia across all classifications. During the Indoor National Championships, the team won the 4x200 relay.
 On October 8th, 2022, The Nansemond River High School Competition Cheer Team won The 5A Southeastern District Cheer Competition for the first time ever. They also won the 5A Regional Cheer Competition with Gloucester High School placing second. On November 5th, 2022, the cheerleaders placed fourth in the state at the VHSL State Cheer Competition with coaches Amanda Lyons and Lindsay Agreste

Extracurricular activities
Nansemond River High School has a wide variety of student activities, including the Nansemond River High School Jazz Band, the Warrior Choir, the International Thespian Society, and JROTC Squad.

There are also many clubs, such as National Beta Club (currently NRHS has the state vice president), Technology Student Association (currently NRHS has the state president and vice president), FBLA, V.O.I.C.E. Club, Key Club, and Anime Club.

References

External links 
 

Educational institutions established in 1990
Schools in Suffolk, Virginia
Public high schools in Virginia
1990 establishments in Virginia